Saw Creek is a census-designated place and Private community located mainly in Lehman Township in Pike County, Pennsylvania, United States, as well as a small portion located in Middle Smithfield Township in Monroe County in Pennsylvania.  As of the 2010 census the population was 4,016 residents.

Demographics

The hamlet had moderate population growth in the 2010s, growing 2.5% during the decade.

References

Census-designated places in Pike County, Pennsylvania
Census-designated places in Monroe County, Pennsylvania
Census-designated places in Pennsylvania